Tujh Sang Preet Lagai Sajna may refer to:

 Tujh Sang Preet Lagai Sajna (Star Plus), a drama series that aired on the Indian satellite television network Star Plus in 2008–2010.
 Tujh Sang Preet Lagai Sajna (Sahara One), an Indian television drama series aired on television channel Sahara One in 2012–2013.